The 1946 United States Senate election in Mississippi was held on November 3, 1946. Incumbent Democratic U.S. Senator Theodore G. Bilbo won re-election to his third term.

Because Bilbo was unopposed in the general election, his victory in the July 2 primary was tantamount to election. He defeated a field of candidates with 51% of the vote.

However, the United States Senate, with a Republican majority and at the request of liberal Democratic Senator Glen H. Taylor of Idaho, refused to seat Bilbo based on his adamant opposition to voting rights for black Americans anywhere in the country, incitement of violence against those blacks who tried to vote, and history of accepting bribes. While his re-entry to the Senate was being contested in 1947, Bilbo died of oral cancer.

Democratic primary

Candidates
Theodore G. Bilbo, incumbent Senator since 1935
Ross A. Collins, former U.S. Representative from Meridian and candidate for Senate in 1934
Tom Ellis
Frank H. Harper
Nelson T. Levings, investment banker

Results

General election

Results

See also 
 1946 United States Senate elections

References

Further reading
 Senator Theodore Bilbo Campaign Speech (Pontotoc) May 7, 1946

Single-candidate elections
1946
MIssissippi
1946 Mississippi elections